The Amajac River is a river of central−eastern Mexico.

Geography
It flows through Hidalgo and San Luis Potosí states.

In San Luis Potosí it joins the Moctezuma River at Tamazunchale. The Moctezuma is a tributary of the Pánuco River and Gulf of Mexico.

See also
List of rivers of Mexico

References

Atlas of Mexico, 1975
The Prentice Hall American World Atlas, 1984.
Rand McNally, The New International Atlas, 1993.

Rivers of Mexico City
Rivers of Hidalgo (state)
Rivers of San Luis Potosí
Rivers of the State of Mexico
Tributaries of the Pánuco River